Mallow was a United Kingdom Parliament constituency in Ireland, returning one MP. It was an original constituency represented in Parliament when the Union of Great Britain and Ireland took effect on 1 January 1801. The constituency lasted until 1885 when it was absorbed into the North East Cork constituency.

Prior to the Union, the Mallow constituency had been represented in the Parliament of Ireland.

Boundaries
This constituency was a parliamentary borough based on the town of Mallow in County Cork. From the 1801 union until 1832, the boundaries and franchise were the same as in the previous Parliament of Ireland constituency, namely all freeholders within the manor of Mallow. The manor comprised the portion of the civil parish of Mallow north of the River Blackwater, as well as three townlands south of the Blackwater – namely Lower (or North) Quartertown, Upper (or South) Quartertown, and Gortnagraiga – which constituted the portion of the civil parish of Mourne Abbey within the barony of Fermoy. For all Irish borough constituencies, the Representation of the People (Ireland) Act 1832 changed the franchise and the ancillary Parliamentary Boundaries (Ireland) Act 1832 defined new boundaries, in most cases accepting the recommendations of a committee appointed the previous year. Mallow was one such case, despite protests from the gentry who would be disenfranchised.
The new boundary was: 

This excluded a large rural hinterland but included the Ballydaheen suburb immediately south of the Blackwater. The new boundary appears on the Ordnance Survey of Ireland's 1878 town plan of Mallow.

Members of Parliament

Elections

Elections in the 1830s

 On petition, 11 votes were struck off of Daunt's total and Jephson was declared elected.

Elections in the 1840s

Elections in the 1850s

Elections in the 1860s

Sullivan was appointed Attorney-General for Ireland, requiring a by-election.

Elections in the 1870s
Sullivan was appointed Master of the Rolls in Ireland, causing a by-election.

Knox stated his intention to petition the return on the basis of bribery and intimidation of the electorate. The petition was successful and a by-election was called.

Waters was appointment Chairman of Quarter Sessions of County Waterford.

Elections in the 1880s

Johnson was appointed Solicitor-General for Ireland, requiring a by-election.

Johnson was appointed a judge and resigned, causing a by-election.

References

The Parliaments of England by Henry Stooks Smith (1st edition published in three volumes 1844–50), 2nd edition edited (in one volume) by F.W.S. Craig (Political Reference Publications 1973)

Westminster constituencies in County Cork (historic)
Constituencies of the Parliament of the United Kingdom established in 1801
Constituencies of the Parliament of the United Kingdom disestablished in 1885
Mallow, County Cork